The Yangzhong Puffer Fish, or the "Puffer Fish Tower" is a notable 295-foot-long bronze statue in the shape of the puffer fish.  Weighing 2,300 tons and reportedly costing $11 million, this statue sits on the banks of the Yangtze River in the Jiangsu Province of China.  Work on this project was completed in 2013.

The Yangzhong Puffer Fish sculpture is the largest steel-framework sculpture in China, and perhaps the entire world.

References

2013 establishments in China
2013 sculptures
Animal sculptures
Bronze sculptures in China
Chinese sculpture
Fish in art
Statues in China
Steel sculptures in China
Colossal statues in China